Chlainomonas is a genus of algae in the family Chlamydomonadaceae.

References

External links

Chlamydomonadaceae
Chlamydomonadales genera